The Stits SA-5 Flut-R-Bug is a homebuilt aircraft designed by Ray Stits.

Design and development
The Flut-R-Bug can be built as a single place or tandem seat aircraft. It was an early complete-kit aircraft, sold with a pre-welded fuselage. Stits planned to deliver 100 kits to the German market for homebuilding. Examples have been completed in the United States and in Europe.

The SA-5 is a mid-wing, tricycle landing gear design with folding wings. The aircraft was intended to be towed by a vehicle by the (lowered) tail on its main gear with wings folded along its sides. The cockpit can be open, or covered with a bubble canopy. The fuselage is constructed from welded steel tubing with aircraft fabric covering. The wings use spruce wooden spars with fabric covering.

Variants
SA-5A
Single place variant
SA-6A
Two seat tandem variant with a  gross weight
SA-6B
Two seat variant with wider span wings and larger tail surface

Specifications (Stits SA-5 Flut-R-Bug)

References

Homebuilt aircraft
Mid-wing aircraft
Single-engined tractor aircraft
Aircraft first flown in 1956
1950s United States sport aircraft